Giełczyn may refer to:
Giełczyn, Masovian Voivodeship (east-central Poland)
Giełczyn, Łomża County in Podlaskie Voivodeship (north-east Poland)
Giełczyn, Mońki County in Podlaskie Voivodeship (north-east Poland)